The 1994 Japanese Touring Car Championship season was the 10th edition of the series and the first to be run under Class II regulations. It began at Autopolis on 24 April and finished after nine events at Fuji Speedway on 30 October. The championship was won by Masanori Sekiya, driving for Toyota Team TOM's.

Teams & Drivers

Calendar

Round 18 was also part of the 1994 Asia-Pacific Touring Car Championship calendar.

Championship Standings
Points were awarded 15, 12, 9, 7, 6, 5, 4, 3, 2, 1 to the top 10 finishers in each race, with no bonus points for pole positions or fastest laps. Drivers counted their 13 best scores.

References

Touring Car Championship
Japanese Touring Car Championship seasons